Robert Crompton Fletcher, MA (9 December 1850 – 27 February 1917) was Archdeacon of Blackburn from 1901 to 1916.

He was born in Fremantle, Western Australia and educated at Heath Grammar School, Halifax where he was admitted in 1861, and at Rossall School  and Sidney Sussex College, Cambridge and ordained in 1874. He was an Assistant Master at King William's College, Isle of Man then Curate of Tarleton. He became the Rector and Vicar of that parish  in 1875 and was in post until 1908. From then he was Rector of Chorley.

He married firstly Nina Rawcliffe  in 1878, with whom he had eight children; and in 1909 Jessie Tyas née Knowles. He was an Alderman of Lancashire County Council from 1889; and  Surrogate of the Diocese of Manchester from 1888.

On his death he was buried in the churchyard of St Mary, Tarleton.

Arms

References

1850 births
1917 deaths
People from Fremantle
People educated at Rossall School
Members of Lancashire County Council
Alumni of Sidney Sussex College, Cambridge
Archdeacons of Blackburn